Ignacious "Ignace" Tirkey is an Indian field Hockey player. He plays as a Fullback and has captained the Indian team.

He also serves the Madras Engineering Group (Madras Sappers corps of engineers) Indian army as a commissioned officer. He holds the rank of Captain.

Early life
Ignace Tirkey's younger brother Prabodh Tirkey also represented India in hockey. He is a product of Panposh Sports Hostel, Rourkela where he was spotted by Indian Army to help him pursue his career.

Career
Tirkey made his debut for the national side in February 2001 at the Akbar el Yom Tournament in Cairo against Belgium. He was a member of Indian team that participated in the Athens Olympic in 2004, where India finished seventh. In club hockey, Tirkey played for Services.

He is most remembered for his goal that he scored between Pakistan's ace striker, Sohail Abbas's legs in the final minutes of 2003 Asia Cup final to give India the winning lead after both teams were locked at 2-2 (India eventually added a 4th goal in the last minute). The match won India its first gold in Asia Cups.

Another highlight of his was in the Muruguppa Gold Cup in Aug 2001, where he scored a golden goal to win final, and thereafter in December 2002 during the National Games in Hyderabad.

Awards

References

External links
 Ignace Tirkey at Orisports
 Ignace Tirkey at bharatiyahockey.org

 

1981 births
Living people
Field hockey players from Odisha
Olympic field hockey players of India
Male field hockey defenders
Field hockey players at the 2006 Commonwealth Games
Recipients of the Arjuna Award
Recipients of the Padma Shri in sports
Indian Christians
Asian Games medalists in field hockey
World Series Hockey players
Field hockey players at the 2004 Summer Olympics
Field hockey players at the 2012 Summer Olympics
2002 Men's Hockey World Cup players
2006 Men's Hockey World Cup players
People from Sundergarh district
Field hockey players at the 2002 Asian Games
Field hockey players at the 2006 Asian Games
Indian male field hockey players
Asian Games silver medalists for India
Medalists at the 2002 Asian Games
Commonwealth Games competitors for India